Amofah is an Ashanti surname found among the Akan people of Ghana and also – among others – the Akan diaspora in the Americas. Notable people with the surname include:
Desmond Amofah (1990–2019), American YouTuber and streamer, better known as Etika
Mark Adu Amofah (born 1987), Ghanaian-born footballer
Samuel Amofa (born 1999), Ghanaian footballer
Owuraku Amofah (born 1956), Ghanaian politician

See also
Akan names 

Surnames of Akan origin